Nagai Muralidharan (born 4 December 1958 in Chennai, Tamil Nadu) is a Carnatic violinist from India. He was awarded Kalaimamani by the State Government of Tamil Nadu in 2003.

Musical career 
Nagai R. Muralidharan is a top-ranking violinist who is sought by leading lights of Carnatic music.  He initially learned from his mother, Smt. R. Komalavalli.  Further training in violin was continued under Sri R.S. Gopalakrishnan, a well-known violinist from Chennai.

His maiden performance was at the age of 10 and his career as a violinist has spanned for over 50 years. Today, he is a top-ranking violinist, noted for his clarity, rich tonal quality and crispness, and has developed a distinct scholarly style of his own. He is also a regular feature in the Radio Sangeetha Sammelan concerts on Doordharshan, and as an accompanist in several compact disks and cassettes.  He also served as a top ranking violin artist in All India Radio, Trichy from 1978 to 2004.

Over the years, Muralidharan has travelled and performed in countries all over the world including the US, Canada, Australia, Europe, Singapore, Malaysia, Dubai, Muscat, Doha, Behrain, Japan and Kuwait.

He has accompanied many artists in their vocal and instrumental concerts including Semmangudi Srinivasa Iyer, Alathur Srinivasa Iyer, M.D. Ramanathan, Dr. M. Balamuralikrishna, Voleti Venkateswarulu, Nedunoori Krishnamurthy, R.K. Srikantan, Maharajapuram V. Santhanam, Madurai Somasundaram, Palghat K.V. Narayanaswamy, T.M. Thyagarajan, D.K. Jayaraman, T.K.Govinda Rao, Dr. S. Ramanathan, B. Rajam Iyer, Tanjore S. Kalyanaraman, Seerkazhi Govindarajan, Chidambaram C.S. Jayaraman, K.J. Yesudas, T.V. Sankaranarayanan, Madurai T.N. Seshagopalan, Neyveli Santhanagopalan, Sanjay Subrahmanyan, P. Unnikrishnan.

Instrumentalists including S. Balachander (veena), M. Balamuralikrishna (viola), T.R. Mahalingam (flute), Dr. N. Ramani (flute), Namagiripetai Krishnan (nadaswaram), A.K.C Natrajan (clarinet), Kadri Gopalnath (saxophone).

In his solo concerts many senior percussion artists accompanied him including Dr. T.K. Murthy, Vellore Ramabadran, Umayalpuram K. Sivaraman, Trichy Sankaran, Guruvayur Dorai, Tanjore Upendran, Karaikudi R. Mani, Mannargudi Easwaran, Srimushnam Raja Rao, Thiruvarur Bakthavatsalam, T.H. Vikku Vinayaka Ram, Thirupanithura Radhakrishnan, Coimbatore Mohanram, V. Suresh and many others.

In 1985, he performed 26 hours non-stop marathon violin concert held at Sri Rangam Temple at Tamil Nadu. Muralidharan has accompanied Sri K.J. Yesudas in Dubai on the anniversary of the 50th Indian Independence Day celebration in 1997.

Awards and titles 

Kalaimamani - Tamil Nadu State Government – (2003)

Arsha Kala Bhushanam – Arsha Kala Gurukulam – Poojya Swamiji Dayananda Saraswathi – (2007)

Maharajapuram Santhanam Memorial Award – Maharajapuram Santhanam Trust (2009)

Sahrudaya Seva Rathna – Shi-Ba Sangeetha Sabha Chennai (2009)

Vani Kala Sudhakra – Sri Thyaga Brahma Gana Sabha (2010)

Sangeet Natak Academi Award – Government of India (2010)

Gaana Padhmam – Brahma Gana Sabha, Chennai (2011)

Asthana Vidwan - Kanchi Kamakoti Peetam, Kanchipuram - (2014)

Sangeetha Rathnakara - Bhairavi Fine Arts, Cleveland, Ohio, USA (2015)

Discography 
 "Young maestros" - 1988
 "Na Jeevadhara" - 2014

References

https://www.thehindu.com/news/cities/Delhi/sangeet-natak-akademi-fellowships-for-four-eminent-artistes/article2284394.ece
https://www.thehindu.com/news/cities/chennai/ldquoNo-language-barrier-for-music/article15586542.ece
https://www.thehindu.com/features/friday-review/music/Award-for-violinist/article16893098.ece

1958 births
Living people
Musicians from Chennai
Violinists
Recipients of the Sangeet Natak Akademi Award